The Gangster Chronicles is a 1981 American crime drama television miniseries starring Michael Nouri, Joe Penny, Jon Polito, Louis Giambalvo, Kathleen Lloyd, Madeleine Stowe, Chad Redding, Markie Post, Allan Arbus, James Andronica, Robert Davi, Joseph Mascolo, and narrated by E.G. Marshall.

Overview
A historically-based crime drama about the lives of gangsters Bugsy Siegel, Lucky Luciano and Meyer Lansky.

There were 13 60-minute episodes. The series was narrated by E. G. Marshall.

Cast
 Michael Nouri as Charles "Lucky" Luciano
 Joe Penny as Benny "Bugsy" Siegel
 Brian Benben as Michael Lasker (The character was based on real life Jewish gangster Meyer Lansky who was still alive when the series went to production. The character's name was changed to Michael Lasker to avoid legal complications)
 Jon Polito as Tommy "Three Finger Brown" Lucchese
 George DiCenzo as Arnold Rothstein
 Kathleen Lloyd as Stella Siegel
 Madeleine Stowe as Ruth Lasker
 Chad Redding as Joy Osler
 Markie Post as Chris Brennan
 Allan Arbus as Goodman
 Louis Giambalvo as Al Capone
 James Andronica as Frank Costello
 Robert Davi as Vito Genovese
 Joseph Mascolo as Salvatore Maranzano
 David Wilson as Vincent "Mad Dog" Coll
 Kenneth Tigar as Thomas E. Dewey
 Richard S. Castellano as Giuseppe "Joe The Boss" Masseria
 Jonathan Banks as Dutch Schultz
 Karen Kondazian as Mrs. Luciano
 Michael Ensign as Owen "Owney The Killer" Madden
 Thom Rachford as Charles "King" Solomon
 Vincent Schiavelli as Jacob "Gurrah" Shapiro

Gangster Wars

Gangster Wars is a 1981 American crime film directed by Richard C. Sarafian and based on the original Gangster Chronicles telecast. The film tells the story of three teenagers, based on real life gangsters Charles "Lucky" Luciano (Michael Nouri), Benjamin "Bugsy" Siegel (Joe Penny) and Michael Lasker (Brian Benben) (a fictional character who was most likely modeled after Meyer Lansky), growing up in New York's ghettos during the early 1900s to their rise through organized crime.

This movie was a three-hour opener for the subsequent miniseries. In addition to the characters above Brian Benben's character is a fictional composite of several mobsters (here named "Michael Lasker"). While the miniseries covered seven decades, the opener takes us from 1907 to the Prohibition era of the 1920s. After its initial run, the entire Gangster Chronicles saga was boiled down to 121 minutes and released to videocassette as Gangster Wars.

References

Sources

External links

1980s American television miniseries
1981 American television series debuts
1981 American television series endings
Cultural depictions of gangsters
Cultural depictions of Al Capone
Cultural depictions of Bugsy Siegel
Cultural depictions of Lucky Luciano
Cultural depictions of Meyer Lansky
Cultural depictions of Arnold Rothstein
Cultural depictions of Dutch Schultz
Cultural depictions of Frank Costello
Cultural depictions of Mad Dog Coll
Cultural depictions of Vito Genovese
Cultural depictions of Salvatore Maranzano
Television series set in the 20th century
NBC original programming
Television series about organized crime
Works about the American Mafia
Films about Jewish-American organized crime
Works about Irish-American organized crime
Works about Jewish-American organized crime
Films directed by Richard C. Sarafian